Okruashvili is a Georgian surname. Notable people with the surname include:

Adam Okruashvili (born 1989), Georgian judoka
Irakli Okruashvili (born 1973), Georgian politician

Georgian-language surnames